George Cabot Lodge II (born July 7, 1927) is an American professor and former politician. In 1962, he was the Republican nominee for a special election to succeed John F. Kennedy in the United States Senate, but was defeated by Ted Kennedy. He was the son of Henry Cabot Lodge Jr., who lost reelection to the Senate in 1952 to John F. Kennedy. His father was also the vice presidential nominee for the Republican party in 1960, an election won yet again by Kennedy.

Early life

Lodge was born on July 7, 1927. His father was Henry Cabot Lodge, Jr., a United States Senator from Massachusetts, U.S. Ambassador to the United Nations and South Vietnam, and the Republican nominee for Vice President in 1960. After finishing high school at Groton School, Lodge served in the U.S. Navy from 1945–1946, and then entered Harvard College, graduating cum laude in 1950. While at Harvard, he was a member of the Krokodiloes.

Career
Lodge was a political reporter and columnist at the Boston Herald prior to entering federal civil service. In 1954, Lodge became Director of Information at the U.S. Department of Labor. In 1958, he was appointed Assistant Secretary of Labor for International Affairs by Dwight D. Eisenhower, and was re-appointed by John F. Kennedy in 1961. He was the United States Delegate to the International Labour Organization, and was elected chairman of the organization's Governing Body in 1960.

He later entered politics, and was the 1962 U.S. Senate candidate from Massachusetts against Ted Kennedy, marking the third time in history that the Lodges faced the Kennedys in a Massachusetts election. Previously, Lodge's father was the incumbent 1952 U.S. Senate candidate from Massachusetts against John F. Kennedy for the same seat. Additionally, Lodge's patrilineal great-grandfather Henry Cabot Lodge was re-elected for the same Senate seat as the incumbent 1916 U.S. Senate candidate against the Kennedy brothers' maternal grandfather, John F. Fitzgerald.

In 1961, Lodge became a member of the Harvard Business School faculty, leaving to run for office in 1962, before returning the following year. He remained at Harvard until his retirement in 1997, when he became Professor Emeritus. He conducted research, published articles, and received honorary fellowships and distinctions in the latter parts of his career.

Personal life 
Lodge met his first wife, the late Nancy Kunhardt, daughter of author Dorothy Kunhardt, while she was studying at the Harvard Graduate School of Education, and they married in 1949. They have three sons and three daughters. One of their daughters, also named Nancy, is a published children's author and professor of art history.

Archives and records
George Cabot Lodge papers at Baker Library Special Collections, Harvard Business School

Ancestry

References

Bibliography 
Incomplete
Books

External links 
Profile — Harvard Business School
George Cabot Lodge papers at Baker Library Special Collections, Harvard Business School

1927 births
Living people
Cabot family
Groton School alumni
Harvard College alumni
Harvard Business School faculty
Massachusetts Republicans
Military personnel from Massachusetts
United States Navy personnel of World War II
Gardiner family
Lodge family